The Beersheba Subdistrict was one of the subdistricts of Mandatory Palestine. It was located in modern-day southern Israel. The city of Beersheba was the capital. After the 1948 Arab–Israeli War, the subdistrict largely transformed into the Beersheba Subdistrict of Israel. 

The vast majority of the population, approximately 90%, consisted of nomadic Palestinian Bedouins.

Depopulated towns and villages

(current localities in parentheses)

 Auja al-Hafir (Nessana)
 Beersheba 
 al-Imara (Ofakim, Urim)
 al-Jammama (Ruhama)
 al-Khalasa 
 Umm al-Rashrash (Eilat)
 Khirbat Futais (Al-Qadirat clan of Al-Tiyaha tribe) (Ofakim)

References

Subdistricts of Mandatory Palestine
 
States and territories established in 1920